Arno Santamaria (born 1978 in Argenteuil, France) is a French singer-songwriter.

Biography 

Arno Santamaria taught himself to play the guitar alone. At 15 he formed a hard-rock band and played several rock and hard-rock scenes. At 17 he discovered Léo Ferré and began writing songs. He obtained a degree from Schola Cantorum de Paris as an audio engineer.

In 2009, he made his first album via Spidart, a crowdfunding platform.

In 2012, his second album 1362 was made with the help of 1362 producers on MyMajorCompany.  He was the opening act for concerts by Murray Head, Gérald de Palmas and Arno.

Rising Star
In 2014, Arno was candidate at the French version of Rising Star. He seduced the audience, and the singer Cali who was in the jury, by singing his own compositions. He finished in second place. After that Arno signed a contract with Capitol Records. In December, an EP with 4 tracks has been released and a third album was released in June 2015.

Discography

Albums

EP 
2014: Debout (je me sens bien)

Singles

Award 
 2012 : Discovery by Public Francophone Radios

References

External links 
 Official site

French composers
French male composers
French rock musicians
1978 births
Living people
21st-century French singers
21st-century French male singers